Macrocoma leprieuri is a species of leaf beetle from North Africa and the Arabian Peninsula to the Horn of Africa. It was first described by Édouard Lefèvre in 1876, as a species of Pachnephorus.

Subspecies
There are two subspecies of M. leprieuri:
Macrocoma leprieuri leprieuri (Lefèvre, 1876): The nominotypical subspecies. Distributed in Morocco, Algeria, Tunisia, and the United Arab Emirates. Also reported from Saudi Arabia, Yemen, Egypt, Libya, Sudan, Ethiopia and Somalia. It measures between 3.6 and 4.5 mm.
Macrocoma leprieuri majuscula Bechyné, 1957: Found in Egypt. It is larger in size than the nominal form of the species, measuring between 4.5 and 6 mm.

References

leprieuri
Beetles of Africa
Beetles of North Africa
Beetles of Asia
Insects of the Arabian Peninsula
Insects of Sudan
Insects of Ethiopia
Insects of Somalia
Taxa named by Édouard Lefèvre